Johnny Rodríguez (born 16 May 1940 in San Juan, Puerto Rico) is a Puerto Rican former basketball player who competed in the 1960 Summer Olympics.

References

1940 births
Living people
Puerto Rican men's basketball players
1959 FIBA World Championship players
Olympic basketball players of Puerto Rico
Basketball players at the 1960 Summer Olympics
Basketball players at the 1959 Pan American Games
Pan American Games medalists in basketball
Pan American Games silver medalists for Puerto Rico
Medalists at the 1959 Pan American Games